Wyoming is a state in the United States of America. 

Wyoming may also refer to:

Places

Australia
 Wyoming, New South Wales, a suburb of the Central Coast region

Canada
 Wyoming, Ontario, Canada, a former village
 Wyoming craton, a geological formation in Canada and the United States

United States
 Wyoming Territory, a territory which became the state in 1890
 Wyoming, Delaware, a town
 Wyoming, Keweenaw County, Michigan, an unincorporated community
 Wyoming, Illinois, a city
 Wyoming, Iowa, a city
 Wyoming, Michigan, a city
 Wyoming, Minnesota, a city
 Wyoming, Nebraska, an unincorporated community
 Wyoming, New York, a village
 Wyoming County, New York
 Wyoming Correctional Facility, a state men's prison in Attica, Wyoming County, New York
 Wyoming, Ohio, a city
 Wyoming, Pennsylvania, a borough
 Wyoming County, Pennsylvania
 Wyoming Valley, Pennsylvania
 Wyoming, Rhode Island, a village and census-designated place
 Wyoming, West Virginia, an unincorporated community
 Wyoming City, West Virginia, also known as Wyoming, an unincorporated community
 Wyoming County, West Virginia
 Wyoming, Iowa County, Wisconsin, a town
 Wyoming, Waupaca County, Wisconsin, a town
 Wyoming (community), Wisconsin, an unincorporated community
 Wyoming Range, a mountain range in Wyoming
 Wyoming Peak, a mountain in the Wyoming Range
 Wyoming Township (disambiguation)
 Wyoming craton, a geological formation in Canada and the United States

Buildings
 Wyoming, Birchgrove, New South Wales, Australia, a heritage-listed residence
 Wyoming Cottage, Wyoming, New South Wales, a heritage-listed residence
 Wyoming (Studley, Virginia), United States, a house on the National Register of Historic Places
 Wyoming (Clinton, Maryland), United States, a house on the National Register of Historic Places

Arts and entertainment

Fictional characters
 Wyoming "Wyoh" Knott, in Robert A. Heinlein's novel The Moon Is a Harsh Mistress
 Wyoming, a character in the machinima series Red vs. Blue

Films
 Wyoming (1928 film), a Western directed by W. S. Van Dyke
 Wyoming (1940 film), a Western starring Wallace Beery
 Wyoming (1947 film), a Western directed by Joseph Kane

Music
"Wyoming" (song), the state song of Wyoming
Wyoming, a 2013 album by Water Liars

Schools
 University of Wyoming, Laramie, Wyoming
 Wyoming High School (Michigan), Wyoming, Michigan
 Wyoming High School (Ohio), Wyoming, Ohio
 Wyoming Seminary, a Methodist college preparatory school in Wyoming Valley, Pennsylvania

Ships
 Wyoming (schooner), the world's largest wooden schooner
 USS Wyoming, several ships
 Wyoming-class battleship, a US Navy class of two dreadnought battleships commissioned in 1912

Other uses
 Battle of Wyoming (1778), in the American Revolution
 Wyoming Station (disambiguation), various railroad and subway stations in the United States and Canada
 El Gran Wyoming, stage name of Spanish television presenter, actor and humorist Monzón Navarro (born 1955)

See also